George Poe Wuerch (born 1936) is an American politician and a member of the Republican Party. He served as mayor of Anchorage, Alaska from 2000 to 2003.

In the 2003 mayoral election, he was defeated for reelection by former city assemblyman Mark Begich. Before this, Wuerch was chair of the Anchorage Assembly and chair of the board of directors for the Anchorage Chamber of Commerce.

A retired United States Marine Corps officer with 21 years of service, Wuerch has also been governmental affairs manager for the Northwest Alaskan Gasline, the founder and president of Fluor Daniel Alaska Engineering, and the vice president of corporate affairs for the Alyeska Pipeline Service Company.

Education
Wuerch attended Oregon State University and graduated in 1957 with his wife Brenda Wuerch. While in OSU Wuerch was a member of Phi Delta Theta fraternity.

Political career
As mayor of Anchorage, George Wuerch removed a gay pride exhibit from the Loussac Library creating controversy and a lawsuit against the city.

Family
George and Brenda Wuerch have two daughters, Karrie Wuerch who lives in Corvallis, Oregon and Debra Wuerch who resides in Anchorage, Alaska.

See also

2000 Anchorage mayoral election
2003 Anchorage mayoral election

References

External links
 U.S. Senate Committee on Environment & Public Works Hearing Statements - Hon. George Wuerch, Mayor, Municipality of Anchorage, AK

1930s births
21st-century American politicians
Alaska Republicans
American energy industry businesspeople
Anchorage Assembly members
Businesspeople from Alaska
Date of birth missing (living people)
Living people
Mayors of Anchorage, Alaska
Oregon State University alumni
Politicians from Tacoma, Washington
United States Marine Corps officers
People from Tacoma, Washington